Scheme Birds is a 2019 documentary film directed by Ellen Fiske and Ellinor Hallin featuring a teenage girl living in Jerviston (Motherwell, Scotland).

The film premiered at the 2019 Tribeca Film Festival, where it won the Best Feature Documentary award and the Best New Documentary Director award.

References

External links
 
 Scheme Birds on Cineuropa

2019 films
2019 documentary films
Motherwell
Films shot in Scotland
Films set in Scotland
Swedish documentary films
Scottish documentary films
2010s English-language films
2010s British films
2010s Swedish films